Franklin Benjamin Richards is a fictional character appearing in American comic books published by Marvel Comics. The character is usually depicted as a supporting character in Fantastic Four. He has been portrayed as a child and as a budding superhero, albeit inexperienced.

Franklin is an immensely powerful being with vast reality-manipulating and psionic powers beyond Omega level mutants, despite not being a mutant himself (though he was believed to be a mutant throughout most of his appearances). He is the young son of Mister Fantastic and the Invisible Woman of the Fantastic Four, the older brother of Valeria Richards, and the nephew of Invisible Woman's younger brother, the Human Torch. His parents named him Franklin Benjamin Richards; his middle name is taken from his godfather Ben Grimm, the Thing. Franklin's first name comes from Franklin Storm, his maternal grandfather. He has started using the code name Powerhouse. During the Dawn of X storyline, Franklin became human again and went back to live a normal, everyday life.

Publication history
Franklin first appears in Fantastic Four Annual #6 (November 1968), and was created by Stan Lee and Jack Kirby, although he didn't receive his name until two years later in Fantastic Four #94 (January 1970). Lee recounted: 

Appearing sporadically in the pages of Fantastic Four over the following fifteen years, Franklin became a member of the pre-teen superhero team Power Pack as of issue #17 (December 1985) of that title until its cancellation with issue #62 (February 1991). From November 1994 an older version of the same character (aged for the purposes of a story) appeared in the pages of Marvel's Fantastic Force until publication ceased as of April 1996. Between appearances in these other titles, Franklin has remained a recurring cast member of the Fantastic Four comic book. From July 2007 until the series' cancellation in February 2009, an alternate version of Franklin appeared as a cast member in the Marvel Adventures all-ages Power Pack series of titles.

Fictional character biography

Origin
Richards was born in New York City to Reed and Susan Richards. He began manifesting his powers while still a toddler due to his parents' radiation-altered genes, which drew the attention of Annihilus, who sought to use Franklin as a source for his own resurgence, transferring some measure of the child's latent power to himself with a gene-based machine, and releasing Franklin's full potential in the process. Fearing the immediate threat of his son's powers to the entire populace of Earth and unable to find another solution in time, Reed Richards shut down Franklin's mind.

During a battle between Ultron-7 and the Fantastic Four, Ultron's energy output awoke Franklin and again released his powers, resulting in the sentient robot's defeat. Free of the energies expended in the confrontation with Ultron, Franklin was seemingly returned to his normal power level.

Needing someone to watch over Franklin in their absence, Reed and Susan Richards came to rely on the services of an elderly woman known as Agatha Harkness, who is also a benevolent witch. Franklin and Agatha soon developed a familial-like bond, even residing together for a time at Whisper Hill (Agatha's old residence, which was regularly destroyed and rebuilt). Eventually, Agatha returned to live in the secret witch community of New Salem, Colorado, and Franklin moved back in permanently with his parents and the rest of the Fantastic Four. His powers, no longer dormant, continued to manifest themselves.

Under the care of yet another guardian, a robot nicknamed H.E.R.B.I.E., Franklin unintentionally used his reality warping abilities to age himself into adulthood. In this form, he was an adept at molecular manipulation and psionics. On realizing his mistake, he restored himself to childhood.

Despite his youth and inexperience, Franklin, a victim of many threats and abductions, has exhibited great courage in the face of overwhelming peril. Time and again, he has unknowingly saved innocent lives, including that of his famous family, from the likes of villainous perpetrators, such as Blastaar, Norman Osborn, Onslaught, Nicholas Scratch, and even the all-powerful Mephisto, whom he temporarily destroyed and later defeated on two separate occasions.

Attempt at a normal life
To try to give his son a "normal" life, Reed Richards devised psychic inhibitors to prevent his powers from being used, but Franklin, whether by fault or by intent, could still at times bypass the inhibitors and use his powers, such as projecting an image of himself at a long distance. At this point he secretly joined a team of pre-teen superheroes called Power Pack, in which he was code-named "Tattletale".

Franklin's adventures with Power Pack gained him an enemy in the alien Zn'rx, and allies and friends in the Kymellian Whitemanes. Franklin was particularly close to the young Kofi Whitemane, who declared Franklin an honorary cousin in much the same way as the children of Power Pack had been adopted as honorary Whitemanes. Franklin also regarded the Power children and their parents as a sort of surrogate family — his association with them beginning at a time when he was feeling particularly distant from his parents at a time when they were living at Avengers Mansion. During this period Franklin also bonded emotionally with Avengers associate and manservant Edwin Jarvis, as Jarvis was his primary caretaker while Franklin stayed at the mansion. His friendship with the Power children also gave Franklin a taste of life among siblings, which the lonely Franklin would not experience until much later when his sister Valeria was born.

The Richards and Power families became fast friends, though neither family's parents realized that any of the children other than Franklin were superpowered (though Susan and Reed discovered this later). Franklin even kept his membership of Power Pack a secret from his own parents: when he appeared before them in image form (see above) he would stick to ordinary clothes, only appearing in his Power Pack outfit before other heroes such as Kitty Pryde.

Franklin even lived with the Power family for a time, when his parents decided that a superhero headquarters was a dangerous place for a child to live, and wanted Franklin to spend time in a "normal" family environment. He returned to his family when Power Pack temporarily left Earth for the Kymellian homeworld.

Psi-Lord
Franklin was later kidnapped by his time-traveling grandfather Nathaniel Richards, and replaced with his teenage counterpart, Psi-Lord, who had been raised by Nathaniel in a dimension outside of time. Franklin, as Psi-Lord, helped create the short-lived team known as Fantastic Force. By tapping a stud hidden within the glove of his costume, Franklin was able to summon battle armor from a pocket dimension; it was designed specifically to siphon off the full measure of his powers. As such, Franklin's abilities at this time were limited to telepathy, precognition, and psionic energy blasts.

Around this time, Sue's dark persona, Malice, began warring within her mind for supremacy of her body, causing Sue to become more prone to angry outbursts and a more violent use of her powers, as well as starting to wear a more revealing costume. Eventually, Psi-Lord expunged the Malice personality from Sue's body into his own. There, Malice plagued Psi-Lord for a short time. Later during a battle against the Dark Raider (an evil alternate reality version of Reed Richards) Psi-Lord and the Invisible Woman forced the Malice persona into the Raider's mind leading to his defeat and the apparent destruction of the Malice persona.

Nathaniel eventually revealed that in another possible future timeline, Franklin Richards would, with Rachel Summers, father a terrible time-and dimension-traveling supervillain named Hyperstorm. In an effort to divert the attention of the Fantastic Four, Nathaniel traveled back to the precise point in time when Franklin was abducted by Nathaniel Richards and returned the child to his parents mere seconds after he was first kidnapped, thus rendering the Psi-Lord version of Franklin Richards obsolete in the Earth-616 timeline.

Onslaught
Shortly after these events, Onslaught kidnaps Franklin in order to use his abilities to reshape reality. To defeat Onslaught, the Fantastic Four, the Avengers, the X-Men, and several other heroes destroy first his physical form, and then his psychic form. In the process, Franklin's parents seemingly die. Franklin displays his true power, singlehandedly creating the "Heroes Reborn" pocket universe to contain the heroes who had "died" in that adventure. Some of them are recreated based on Franklin's memories of them, such as the temporally-displaced teenage Tony Stark becoming an adult once more while the mutated Wasp is restored to human form. While his parents are away in the Heroes Reborn universe, Generation X and Alicia Masters look after Franklin. This universe comes to be represented by a small, bluish ball which Franklin carries with him.

Franklin travels with several X-Men to the farm owned by Hank McCoy's parents. He plays with Artie Maddicks and Leech, both mutant children. The Celestials recognize that Franklin represents the culmination of their genetic experiments, that he has power to rival even theirs. Ashema, one of the Celestials, representing herself as a human, visits Franklin. Ultimately, Franklin, Ashema and other forces allow the rightful heroes to return and both universes to remain functioning.

In the wake of Mr. Fantastic's activation of the Ultimate Nullifier to destroy Abraxas, Franklin loses all his powers in the process of reforming Galactus and thus becomes a normal child. Shortly afterwards, Doctor Doom makes a pact with the Haazareth Three to gain vast magical power. During Doom's attacks upon the Fantastic Four, Franklin is sucked into Hell by the Haazareth. After the defeat of Doom, his parents rescue him, but Franklin has a hard time coping with the traumatic experience of being tormented in Hell. The Thing helps Franklin make a complete mental recovery by assuring him that, even if they couldn't always keep him safe, they would never give up on him.

When the Scarlet Witch uses her powers to depower countless mutants, including Magneto and Professor X, the power lost by Magneto and Xavier combines and restores Onslaught, whose consciousness still lingered after his death. Onslaught takes control of both the Human Torch and Mister Fantastic in an attempt to get Franklin but is interrupted by the Thing and Invisible Woman.

When Franklin flees to Counter-Earth, Onslaught follows him. The Avengers assess their new threat which did not exist until Franklin appeared. After a brief skirmish, the heroes and villains decide to work together to defeat Onslaught. Rikki Barnes defeats him using a Fantasticar to send them both through the Negative Zone barrier in the Fantastic Four's lab, trapping them. Franklin returns home, Barnes finds herself on Earth-616, and Onslaught is seen floating outside the Area 42 Prison in the Negative Zone.

Secret Invasion
In the beginning of the Skrull strike on Earth, the Skrull Lyja, impersonating Sue Richards, sends the entire Baxter Building into the Negative Zone with Franklin, Valeria, and Johnny Storm inside. Franklin and Valeria team up with Johnny and the Thing to fight the Skrulls. Benjamin Grimm asks the help of the Tinkerer, who is a prisoner in the prison for the unregistered villains in the Negative Zone. The Tinkerer refuses, seeing no reason to help the people who arrested him as he was taking his grandchildren out for ice cream, and sent him to prison without due process. Franklin and Valeria plead with the Tinkerer. They strongly remind the old man of his own grandchildren. He is moved to tears, repents and agrees to help, in exchange for his freedom and reunion with his grandkids.

Dark Reign
During the Dark Reign: Fantastic Four miniseries; Franklin finds himself along with his sister under siege by Norman Osborn, Venom and a high number of H.A.M.M.E.R. agents. The siblings were on their own due to their father's experiment which left him unreachable and the other members of the Fantastic Four stranded in alternate realities.

Valeria manages to separate Osborn from the rest of the H.A.M.M.E.R. agents by using a bureaucratic technicality and by having them underestimate her. Osborn is led into a room where he faces Franklin who is wearing a Spider-Man mask and calls him a villain. In the next scene, the two are chased down a hall by Osborn who is getting ready to shoot them. The Fantastic Four return just in time to protect the children. Mister Fantastic tells Osborn to leave the Baxter Building and not to come back. Osborn attempts to shoot Reed, only to be shot in the shoulder by Franklin. The gun Franklin used is by all accounts, a simple toy.

On his birthday, Franklin is seemingly attacked by a strange intruder which is later revealed to be a future version of Franklin himself sent back through time to deliver a warning to Valeria about an approaching conflict. In the final pages, it is revealed that the attack by the adult Franklin was to plant a telepathic suggestion in the mind of his present-day counterpart, thereby apparently reawakening young Franklin's dormant mutant powers; in actuality, Franklin is not a mutant, but has subconsciously convinced the wider world at large that he is.

Search for the Invisible Woman
Franklin and his sister contact X-Factor Investigations, led by Madrox the Multiple Man. They find that their mother has strangely disappeared and think that their father had something to do with it. According to the children, Reed Richards had been acting very strange the last couple of days. The team investigates and find that not only Sue was trapped, but also Reed, who has been replaced with an alternate version being mind-controlled by an alternate version of Doctor Doom. X-Factor find the real Reed in Latveria. X-Factor and the Fantastic Four battle Doctor Doom and Layla Miller. Doom lets them "rescue" Sue and tells them all to leave. During the battle in New York, the alternate Doom/Reed is accidentally killed.

Fear Itself
During the Fear Itself storyline, Franklin, against his father's prior wishes, uses his reality-warping powers to free Ben Grimm from the possession of an Asgardian warrior general named Angrir: Breaker of Souls by transforming him back into the Thing.

Future Foundation
Franklin is approached by a mysterious stranger, who has been secretly tutoring him in the use of his powers. The stranger is later revealed to be a future adult incarnation of Franklin himself, who reiterates to his young counterpart that his powers must be properly harnessed for a singular intent: the act of life preservation. In a confrontation between the Future Foundation and the Mad Celestials of Earth-4280, Franklin is described by one of the Celestials as 'beyond [the] Omega classification' applied to mutants, and is subsequently attacked with concussion beams. Franklin repels their attacks.

Upon successfully creating a new future and simultaneously acting as an anchor for the changes he made in the process following the collapse of all reality into a single timestream, culminating with the heat death of everything, the adult Franklin, alongside his sister, a future incarnation of Valeria Richards, enters the fray in the final struggle against the Mad Celestials of Earth-4280. He warps the three Celestials away to the inner sphere of a local gas giant. He then acquires an orb containing his younger counterpart's powers, which he stores within his chest. When the Celestials return, the adult Franklin uses the orb to revive an incapacitated Galactus. Franklin and Galactus confront the Celestials and destroy them in a prolonged battle. In the aftermath, the adult Franklin shares a brief moment with Galactus. The two discuss the heat death of everything and the revelation of Franklin's immortality, specifically that he will, billions of years from now, stand beside Galactus to witness the birth of a new universe.

Secret Wars
Following the inevitable end of Marvel Multiverse, caused by the incursions, Doctor Doom gained the omnipotent power of the Beyonders and used it to gather the remnants of the destroyed realities to create a patchwork planet called Battleworld. Eventually those powers were stripped from Doctor Doom by the Molecule Man and transferred to Reed Richards. With his new powers, Reed along with his family, the Future Foundation and Molecule Man, began restoring the multiverse, while also creating entirely new realities.

Multiversal adventures
As they rebuild the multiverse, a being self-described as the embodiment of entropy, the Griever at the End of All Things, patiently waited to strike until Franklin Richards is depleted of his ability to create new universes as she repudiated their mission, claiming they overstepped their purpose. During this time, Franklin has taken up the codename of Powerhouse. With the help from the heroes who were part of the Fantastic Four’s expanding members, including X-Men’s Iceman, they were able to defeat the Griever’s army. Franklin and Valeria, and their parents bids their fellow Foundation members, entrusted by Dragonman a farewell, as Earth wanted the Fantastic Four to return.

Return to Earth
Because time worked very differently when they were rebuilding the multiverse, Franklin and his sister returned to Earth as young teenagers many days after the Hydra Captain America’s Secret Empire. After returning to Earth, his family entrusted their old Baxter Building to the superhero team Fantastix, and moved to Thing’s hometown Yancy Street as a new base operation and home. When a wedding between his god-uncle Thing and his new god-aunt Alicia is about to begin many days later, Franklin begin to dye his hair black.

Another problem arose with Franklin's powers, they became depleted every time Franklin used them, for unknown reasons and even his father cannot understand why.

Dawn of X
Since Krakoa became a safe haven for all mutants, accessible only to those who carry the X-gene, an invitation was made to Franklin to live on the island of Krakoa, however, his parents decided it was better for him to remain with them. But when Xavier noted that Franklin's powers were depleting, he decided it was the right moment to take Franklin to Krakoa. So, Xavier and Magneto concocted a plan to usher Franklin to Krakoa by means of using his relationship with Kitty Pryde, employing the premise that they would be either helping Franklin get the full extent of his powers back or discerning if what's happening to young Franklin could also emerge in other mutants.

Later, during the Fantastic Four's confrontation against the unstoppable alien Cormorant, Franklin used the last remains of his powers in an attempt to stop the enemy, but failed. After losing his powers, Franklin tried to travel to Krakoa, only to be interrupted telepathically by Xavier, who informed the youth of the discovery that he was not really a mutant, but rather his mutant status had been a result of him using subconsciously his powers on himself to altering his anatomy in a cellular level. With his powers gone, Franklin was no longer a mutant and as a result, Xavier declared that he was no longer welcomed in Krakoa.

Powers and abilities
Originally, Franklin possesses the power to warp reality, i.e., to make any thought or desire come to fruition, even up to a cosmic scale. He is able to rearrange the molecular structure of matter and energy at will. Once, Franklin subconsciously created his own pocket universe, encompassing a virtual replica of Earth-616. Cosmic entities, including Galactus, Eternity, Infinity, Omniversal Guardian Roma, and Omniversal Majestrix Opal Luna Saturnyne, began to take notice of Franklin's tremendous gifts, going so far to describe him as a "being whom the Celestials felt was on par with themselves". Two Celestials, Ashema the Listener and Nezarr the Calculator, were at one time tasked with retrieving Franklin for evaluation as a new member of the Celestial Host, a group of beings recognized as "gods" by the Eternals and Deviants.

In addition to reality and molecular manipulation, Franklin has vast psionic powers that have manifested as telepathy, telekinesis, energy blasts of concussive force, precognition, and astral projection. Being a child, Franklin's abilities are restricted to an extent by his limited control. Moreover, it remains unclear what power levels Franklin will ultimately achieve as an adult, as several future incarnations from alternate realities as well as the mainstream Marvel universe have been shown to vary in power. One such manifestation of Franklin in adult form was able to destroy two Celestials from Earth-4280 during physical combat; in the aftermath of their defeat, Franklin's immortality was strongly implied. The same individual also tapped into the power of his younger self to resurrect and transform Galactus into his own personal herald after the Devourer of Worlds had been rendered unconscious in battle against the Mad Celestials.

Other versions

Days of Future Past
In the 1981 X-Men storyline Days of Future Past, it was revealed that in one possible future, Franklin (known as 'Scrapper') would be the lover of Rachel Summers; he would also meet his untimely death at the hands of Omega Sentinels. In variants of this timeline, Franklin and Rachel give birth to the nigh-unstoppable villain Hyperstorm, a mutant who is capable of drawing virtually limitless energy from Hyperspace itself. Another child Franklin fathers with Rachel (in a reality that only slightly diverges from Earth-811) is known as Dream Summers. Dream, a mutant like her parents, demonstrates telepathy/empathy.

The dream-self of the deceased adult Franklin Richards Earth-811 (seen in the 1990 Days of Future Present crossover) tapped into the powers of both his younger Earth-616 counterpart and Rachel Summers, augmenting his own abilities with the near-infinite energy of the Phoenix Force.

Earth-10235
In his reality, an invasion of Mad Celestials caused a collapse of it into a single timestream and Franklin, Valeria and Nathaniel Richards, were apparently, the only survivors in this reality close to extinction. He made a plan with Valeria and Nathaniel to save the reality, he traveled to Earth-616 and used his reality shifting powers to restore his past counterpart self's mutant abilities, as well as advising the past Valeria about things she has to do in order to save the future.

After Nathaniel Richards battled his other counterparts in a game set by Immortus and remained as the last Reed Richards, Franklin forced him to travel back in time and help the Fantastic Four, at that time Future Foundation, to fight the alternate Reed Richards loose on Earth-616 and deal with the invasion of the Mad Celestials until he and Valeria could escape from the destruction of their reality and arrive to finish their plan. They arrived during Galactus battle against the Mad Celestials and, using his power, he teleported them into a gas giant, withstood direct assault and even killed one by himself. He then, with the help of his younger self's powers, was capable of reviving Galactus, who had been rendered unconscious in battle, and turned him into his herald which he then used to destroy the Celestials. After the reality was saved, Franklin shares a brief moment with Galactus; the two discuss the heat death of everything and the revelation of Franklin's immortality, specifically that he will, billions of years from now, stand beside Galactus to witness the birth of a new universe.

Billions of years later, Franklin is seen with Galactus at the End of Time to witness the birth of the Ninth Cosmos. Franklin is meant to become the next Galactus and while they wait, Galactus chronicles the complete story of the Eighth Cosmos, revealing previously unknown secrets. In a potential timeline, both Franklin and Galactus were killed by the Immortal Hulk who also kills the last Homo Supreme, the ultimate evolution of mutants that was a backup in case Franklin was killed, thus becoming the only being left in the universe. When the Sentience of the Eighth Cosmos came to greet what he thought was Bruce Banner, he soon discovered that it was an elaborate trick put in motion by the One Below All, a malevolent entity that resides in the Below-Place, the deepest layer of Hell, which had possessed the Hulk and then quickly devoured the Sentience of the Eighth Cosmos and absorbed its power.

Fantastic Four: Annual 1998
In Fantastic Four: Annual 1998, a version of Franklin is seen where he aged in real time from his first appearance. He is married to a Wakandan woman named Zawadi and has a daughter named N'Yami. Franklin is also a member of the Fantastic Four named Zero Man and had the ability to access the Negative Zone through a portal that he could create. He had to wear a special Vibranium headband to help him control his abilities.

Earth X
In Earth X, Franklin Richards curses Namor for killing the Human Torch. Half of Namor's body is now constantly burning, even underwater. Afterwards, Franklin takes Galactus' armor and, entering the third stage of his evolution, becomes Galactus himself. As stated in the story, he is Galactus as long as no one tells him he isn't. As Galactus, Franklin Richards saves the Earth by consuming the Celestial growing inside. He reveals himself to his father, Reed, before leaving the Earth, stating he will never return. At the end of the story, Reed, after gaining the cosmic consciousness, states his first task will be to save his son.

Exiles
The Exiles, a group of superheroes taken from several different realities, traveled to a future Earth where their mission was to stop Franklin Richards' son from conquering that world. Franklin himself is not shown in this storyline.

Franklin Richards: Son of a Genius

In the out-of-continuity humor series Franklin Richards: Son of a Genius, Franklin is portrayed as a Calvin-esque troublemaker who can't resist "playing" with his father's inventions, with disastrous results. Franklin must then scramble to reverse the effects/clean up after the results of his "play", with the help of his long-suffering robot nanny H.E.R.B.I.E. (who essentially plays a Hobbes-esque role), or face punishment from his parents. The first twelve Son of a Genius one-shots were drawn by Chris Eliopoulos and co-written by Eliopoulos and Marc Sumerak. Since then, Eliopoulos has written them solo.

Franklin Richards: Son of a Genius began as a series of back-up strips, each one appearing in all Marvel books released in a certain publishing week. The strips were well received by Marvel readership and the concept was granted a self-titled one-shot, which primarily reprinted the published strips to date. Subsequent books in the series have consisted of new material, and they are currently being published on a roughly quarterly basis. There have been fourteen specials published so far, and this particular version of Franklin and H.E.R.B.I.E. has since appeared with Lockjaw and the Pet Avengers in Tails of the Pet Avengers: Dogs of Summer (July 2010).
 Fantastic Four Presents Franklin Richards (Nov. 2005)
 Everybody Loves Franklin (Apr. 2006)
 Super Summer Spectacular (Sept. 2006)
 Happy Franksgiving (Jan. 2007)
 March Madness (May 2007)
 World Be Warned (Aug. 2007)
 Monster Mash (Nov. 2007)
 Fall Football Fiasco (Jan. 2008)
 Spring Break (May 2008)
 Not-So-Secret Invasion (July 2008)
 Summer Smackdown (Oct. 2008)
 Sons of Geniuses (Jan. 2009)
 It's Dark Reigning Cats and Dogs (Apr. 2009)
 April Fools (June 2009)
 School's Out! (July 2009)

House of M
In House of M, Franklin is mentioned by Emma Frost as being one of her patients since the death of his parents.

Marvel Zombies: Dead Days
In the Marvel Zombies: Dead Days one-shot (which served as a prequel to the Marvel Zombies 2005/2006 miniseries), Franklin and his sister Valeria were suddenly eaten by zombie She-Hulk.

MC2
In the MC2 universe, Franklin is in the Fantastic Five under the name of Psi-Lord, his powers reduced to telekinesis after a battle with Hyperstorm. He's also that universe's Nexus Being, someone who exists in all possible realities, a focus of mystical energies. He has a friendly relationship with Spider-Girl. They are mutually attracted to each other until her father, Spider-Man, points out that she is only 15, several years younger than Franklin. After that, Franklin stops flirting with her. It was revealed that Franklin recommended Kate Power to help the Avengers find the powerless Thunderstrike. During Fantastic Five vol. 2 #4, a huge increase in his powers, triggered when Franklin deliberately exposes himself to cosmic rays to enhance his powers to cope with the threat posed by the newly returned Doctor Doom, leaves him with stronger psionic powers and with a blazing skull for a face, forcing him to wear a containment helmet at all times.

Power Pack – All Ages Version
In the Fantastic Four and Power Pack miniseries, an alternate timeline Franklin Richards is promoted a few grades and enrolled in the same class as Jack Power. Because of persecution as a result of him having the Richards name, Reed later decides that he should be kept in the Baxter Building for home schooling, possibly as long as college. Franklin then runs away with Jack, then proceeds to get captured by Doctor Doom. Doom switches bodies with Franklin for a short time to pursue the destruction of the Fantastic Four, leaving Franklin trapped in Doom's comatose body. When Jack Power undoes the body swap, Franklin wakes up and immediately leads the Power Pack in sending Doctor Doom to the Negative Zone.

After this adventure, Julie Power creates a costume for Franklin, dubbing him the "honorary fifth member". The costume looks like a standard Power Pack costume, done in orange and having the all-seeing eye icon of his "Tattletale" costume from the original series. Although the costume was made of regular materials instead of using the alien materials that accounts for the special abilities of the other Power Pack costumes, Franklin's father has modified the "Tattletale" costume using unstable molecules.

In the Power Pack: Day One miniseries, Franklin is staying with the Power family, due to the Fantastic Four going on a space mission. During his stay, Franklin is learning from the Power siblings the origin of how they became Power Pack.

In the first issue of the Skrulls vs. Power Pack miniseries, Franklin and the Power siblings were at a bowling alley, when they were attacked by bounty hunters. While the hunters captured and delivered the Pack to Patchworld, Franklin managed to return to the Baxter Building to ask his parents to help rescue them, but instead depended upon the aid from both the Smartship Friday and his robot nanny H.E.R.B.I.E.

This version of Franklin to date hasn't displayed any powers; he does have great courage and intelligence. He also has some impressive high-tech gadgets that Reed and Franklin built together. These save his life during the Galactic bounty hunter attack.

Franklin, the Power siblings, H.E.R.B.I.E., and Friday eventually reach the Puzzle Planet and solve the mystery of the planet of origin of Eternity's Children, as named in an ancient secret prophecy. All the children do their part with their intelligence and powers to solve the puzzles, but it is Franklin who ties it all together with his scientific knowledge and analytic ability.

With the main continuity, the "Son of a Genius" series, and the all ages version of Power Pack, there are now three different versions (within the different continuities) of Franklin Richards fighting the Skrull invasion.

Forever Yesterday
In an alternate reality detailed in New Warriors #11–13, the Richards family is part of a resistance movement against the tyrannical Sphinx. They join with the family of Dwayne Taylor. Despite their age differences, Franklin and Dwayne are shown as friends. An attack by agents of the Sphinx leaves all but Dwayne murdered.

Other future incarnations
In Power Pack #36 (published in April 1987), Franklin and his friends battled the giant robot Master Mold. The Master Mold's primary objective was to eliminate The Twelve, the future leaders of mutant-kind. Describing Franklin as a mutant entity of the "ultimate" potential, and the only mutant ever to develop such power, the machine visualizes possible future incarnations of the child prior to seeking him out for annihilation. One image depicts Franklin as a young man clad in a dark blue suit with a red jacket, yellow boots, yellow and gloves. Master Mold refers to this adolescent version of Franklin as Ultiman. Another image shows a striking figure somewhat older in appearance than Ultiman (closely resembling the Silver Surfer) with marks upon his face similar to the "hound scars" commonly associated with Rachel Summers of Earth-811. As per Master Mold, this adult incarnation of Franklin is simply called "The Twelfth".

Ultimate Marvel
In Ultimate X-Men/Fantastic Four Annual #1, a young Franklin Richards is part of a future team of X-Men. It is revealed that in all of the possible futures, Franklin is Reed (as Nihil) and Sue's son. He is also revealed to be the host to that timeline's Phoenix force.

In other media

Television
 Franklin Richards (alongside members of Power Pack) makes a cameo appearance in The Super Hero Squad Show episode "Support Your Local Sky-Father!" at a playground Thor is opening, appearing in a blue T-shirt marked with a "4".

Video games
 In the game Marvel: Ultimate Alliance, Franklin is briefly mentioned when speaking to the Invisible Woman in the Hall of Warriors on the Asgard level.
 In the game's sequel, Marvel: Ultimate Alliance 2, Franklin is seen sleeping alongside his sister Valeria Richards. He is left in the care of his father Reed Richards when his mother Susan Richards leaves to join the Anti-Registration movement.

Awards
Awards include:

2008: Chris Eliopoulos was nominated for the "Special Award for Humor" Harvey Award for his work on Franklin Richards.

Collected editions

References

External links
 
 
 
 

Characters created by Jack Kirby
Characters created by Stan Lee
Child characters in comics
Comics characters introduced in 1968
Fantastic Four characters
Fictional characters from New York City
Fictional characters who can manipulate reality
Fictional characters with dimensional travel abilities
Fictional characters with elemental transmutation abilities
Fictional characters with energy-manipulation abilities
Fictional characters with immortality
Fictional characters with precognition
Marvel Comics 2
Marvel Comics characters who can teleport
Marvel Comics characters who have mental powers 
Marvel Comics child superheroes
Marvel Comics male superheroes
Marvel Comics mutants
Marvel Comics mutates 
Marvel Comics telekinetics
Marvel Comics telepaths
Power Pack